The Wrightson Baronetcy, of Neasham Hall in the County of Durham, is a title in the Baronetage of the United Kingdom. It was created on 13 July 1900 for the Conservative politician Thomas Wrightson. He represented Stockton and St Pancras East in the House of Commons. The third Baronet was a Colonel in the Army.

Wrightson baronets, of Neasham Hall (1900)

Sir Thomas Wrightson, 1st Baronet (1839–1921)
Sir Thomas Garmondsway Wrightson, 2nd Baronet (1871–1950)
Sir John Garmondsway Wrightson, 3rd Baronet (1911–1983)
Sir Charles Mark Garmondsway Wrightson, 4th Baronet (born 1951)

The heir apparent is the present holder's son Barnaby Thomas Garmondsway Wrightson (born 1979).

Notes

References
Kidd, Charles, Williamson, David (editors). Debrett's Peerage and Baronetage (1990 edition). New York: St Martin's Press, 1990, 

Wrightson